Culverthorpe Hall, Culverthorpe, Lincolnshire, England is an 18th-century country house. It is a Grade I listed building.

History
In the 17th century the estate at Culverthorpe was held by the Listers. In around 1679, it was bought by Sir John Newton who remodelled the existing house. His son, also John, undertook alterations in 1699. In the 1730s Sir John's grandson, Michael, made further changes, possibly employing either Roger Morris, who certainly worked on Newton's London house, or Robert Morris, who dedicated his Lectures on Architecture to Newton, or both. On his death in 1743, his only son having died in infancy, the estate passed to the Archer-Houblon family. In 1917 Major H. L. Archer Houblon sold the hall and 2170 acres of land, realising a combined total of £49,550. Rodolph Ladeveze Adlercron bought the hall in the early 20th century and employed Reginald Blomfield to undertake alterations. The hall remains privately owned.

Architecture and description
Culverthorpe is of two storeys, with a raised attic. The style is Palladian. The central block is of five bays, and has two adjoining wings. The house is faced in limestone ashlar with slate roofs. Nikolaus Pevsner, in his Buildings of England, notes the possible attributions to either Robert or Roger Morris, or both.

The hall is a Grade I listed building. The stables and garages, originally a service wing but converted in the early 20th century, have their own Grade II* listings. An eyecatcher in the grounds, which comprises the facade of a former family chapel, is also Grade II* listed. The former home farm is listed at Grade II.

Notes

References

Sources
 
 

Houses completed in the 18th century
Grade I listed houses
Grade I listed buildings in Lincolnshire
Country houses in Lincolnshire